Chellappah Suntharalingam (19 August 1895 – 11 February 1985) was a Ceylon Tamil academic, politician, Member of Parliament and government minister.

Early life and family
Suntharalingam was born on 19 August 1895. He was the son of Chellappah and Meenachchi from Urumpirai in northern Ceylon. He was educated at St. John's College, Jaffna and St. Joseph's College, Colombo. In 1914 he entered the University of London from where he graduated with a B.Sc. honours degree in mathematics. He then went on to Balliol College, Oxford from where he was awarded a double first in mathematics tripos.

Suntharalingam hailed from a distinguished family and had four eminent brothers: C. Nagalingam, a Supreme Court judge, was acting Governor-General of Ceylon in 1954; C. Panchalingam was a medical doctor; C. Amirthalingam was Director of Fisheries; and C. Thiagalingam was a leading lawyer.

Suntharalingam married Kanagambikai Ambal, daughter of M. Kanagasabi. They had two sons (Gnanalingam and Sathyalingam) and four daughters (Lingambikai, Lingavathy, Lingamani and Lingeswari).

Career

Suntharalingam was selected by the Indian Civil Service but chose instead to join the Ceylon Civil Service in 1920. He resigned from the civil service to become vice principal of Ananda College. He then joined Ceylon University College as professor and first chair of mathematics. He was called to the Bar from Gray's Inn in 1920, becoming an advocate and practising law in Ceylon.

Becoming interested in politics, Suntharalingam retired in 1940 and entered politics. He tried unsuccessfully to enter the State Council during by-elections in 1943 and 1944. He stood as an independent candidate in Vavuniya at the 1947 parliamentary election. He won the election and entered Parliament. He was persuaded to join the United National Party led government and on 26 September 1947 he was sworn in as Minister of Trade and Commerce. He supported the controversial Ceylon Citizenship Act of 1948 which deprived citizenship to 11% of the Ceylon's population but when division was called on the second reading of the Indian and Pakistani Residents Citizenship Bill on 10 December 1948, Suntharalingam walked out of Parliament. Prime Minister D. S. Senanayake asked for an explanation but Suntharalingam resigned from his ministerial position instead. Suntharalingam became a champion for the rights of Ceylon's Indian Tamils who had been made stateless and disenfranchised by Sinhalese dominated governments after independence. He observed that "if the Buddha were to come to the country today, he himself would be deported" (Buddha was from India, the Sinhalese were Buddhists).

Suntharalingam resigned from Parliament in 1951 as a protest against the adoption of the Sinhala kodiya (flag) as the national flag. He was the only candidate in the ensuing by-election and consequently returned to Parliament. He was re-elected at the 1952 parliamentary election. Suntharalingam vehemently opposed the attempts to make Sinhala the sole official language of Ceylon, stating during the June 1955 throne speech that, if the changes went ahead, Tamils would demand "a separate independent autonomous state of 'Tamil Ilankai' composed of Tamil speaking peoples in Ceylon". He boycotted Parliament from August 1955 in protest against the Sinhala Only Act. After three months of absence he forfeited his seat in Parliament. He won the ensuing by-election and returned to Parliament. He was re-elected at the 1956 parliamentary election.

Suntharalingam founded the Eela Thamil Ottrumai Munnani (Unity Front of Eelam Tamils) in 1959. At the March 1960 parliamentary election Suntharalingam, contesting as an independent as the Eela Thamil Ottrumai Munnani wasn't a registered party, was defeated by T. Sivasithamparam, another independent candidate.

Suntharalingam published Eylom: Beginning of the Freedom Struggle; Dozens Documents in 1963 in which he became one of the first Ceylon Tamils to call for an independent Tamil state, which he called Eylom:

Suntharalingam contested the 1965 parliamentary election as an independent candidate but was defeated by the All Ceylon Tamil Congress candidate T. Sivasithamparam. He contested the 1970 parliamentary election as an independent candidate in Kankesanthurai but was defeated by the Illankai Tamil Arasu Kachchi candidate S. J. V. Chelvanayakam.

Suntharalingam spent his later years in Vavuniya where he died on 11 February 1985.

References

1895 births
1985 deaths
Academic staff of the Ceylon University College
Alumni of Balliol College, Oxford
Alumni of St. John's College, Jaffna
Alumni of Saint Joseph's College, Colombo
Alumni of the University of London
Ceylonese advocates
Faculty of Ananda College
Members of Gray's Inn
Members of the 1st Parliament of Ceylon
Members of the 2nd Parliament of Ceylon
Members of the 3rd Parliament of Ceylon
People from Northern Province, Sri Lanka
People from British Ceylon
Sri Lankan Tamil academics
Sri Lankan Tamil civil servants
Sri Lankan Tamil lawyers
Sri Lankan Tamil politicians
Sri Lankan Tamil teachers
Trade ministers of Sri Lanka